Sharon Vukich is an American curler from Seattle, Washington. She is a two-time women's national Champion, two-time senior women's national champion, and one-time mixed doubles national champion.

Curling career
Vukich skipped her team to gold at the United States Championship twice, in 1980 and 1987. As champion she represented the United States at the World Championships those years, finishing in fourth and fifth place, respectively. She returned to national prominence with back-to-back gold medals at the United States Senior Championships in 2009 and 2010. At World's they finished sixth and fourth places, respectively. In 2010 she also won the Mixed Doubles National Championship with teammate Mike Calcagno. The 2010 World Mixed Doubles Championship was held concurrently with the World Senior Championship and Vukich competed at both. At World Mixed Doubles they finished in tenth place.

Personal life 
Vukich's parents were curlers and helped found the Granite Curling Club in Seattle. Vukich met her late husband Jim while curling. He was also a multi-time national champion, having won the Men's Championship in 1987 and 1989. Vukich's daughter Emily (Em) Good and son Jake Vukich are also successful competitive curlers, Emily having competed at the 2016 World Mixed Curling Championship and Jake at the 2014 World Junior Curling Championships.

Teams

Women's

Mixed doubles

References

External links

Living people
American female curlers
American curling champions
Sportspeople from Seattle
Year of birth missing (living people)
21st-century American women